The Aero Concepts Discovery is an American amateur-built aircraft, produced by Aero Concepts of Florida. The aircraft is supplied as a kit for amateur construction.

Design and development
The Discovery is a three lifting surface aircraft that features a cantilever mid-wing, a twin boom high tail, a canard surface, a two-seats-in-side-by-side configuration enclosed cockpit, fixed tricycle landing gear and a single engine in pusher configuration.

The aircraft is made from composites. The canard uses the same airfoil, while the tailplane uses a NASA 63218. Construction time from the supplied kit is 1200 hours.

The company plans to develop the design into a light-sport aircraft, a jet-powered version and four-seat variant as well.

Operational history
By the end of 2011 three examples had been reported as completed and flown.

Specifications (Discovery)

References

External links

Homebuilt aircraft
Single-engined pusher aircraft
Canard aircraft